Sammy Davis Jr. Sings and Laurindo Almeida Plays is a 1966 studio album by Sammy Davis Jr., accompanied by guitarist Laurindo Almeida.

Track listing
 "Here's That Rainy Day" (Johnny Burke, Jimmy Van Heusen) – 2:19
 "Two Different Worlds" (Al Frisch, Bernie Wayne) – 3:24
 "The Shadow of Your Smile" (Johnny Mandel, Paul Francis Webster) – 4:18
 "Where Is Love?" (Lionel Bart) – 3:04
 "Ev'ry Time We Say Goodbye" (Cole Porter) – 4:08
 "I'm Always Chasing Rainbows" (Harry Carroll, Joseph McCarthy) – 2:25
 "We'll Be Together Again" (Carl T. Fischer, Frankie Laine) – 3:18
 "Joey, Joey, Joey" (Frank Loesser) – 4:23
 "The Folks Who Live On the Hill" (Oscar Hammerstein II, Jerome Kern) – 3:50
 "Speak Low" (Ogden Nash, Kurt Weill) – 3:35
Bonus track on CD reissue
 "Misty" (Johnny Burke, Erroll Garner) - 2:19

Personnel 
 Sammy Davis Jr. – vocals
 Laurindo Almeida – guitar
 George Rhodes – conductor, arranger

References

1966 albums
Sammy Davis Jr. albums
Reprise Records albums
Albums produced by Jimmy Bowen
Laurindo Almeida albums